Glassine is a smooth and glossy paper that is air, water, and grease resistant. It is translucent unless dyes are added to color it or make it opaque. It is manufactured by supercalendering: after pressing and drying, the paper web is passed through a stack of alternating steel- and fiber-covered rolls called a supercalender at the end of the paper machine so that the paper fibers flatten facing in the same direction.

Usage
Glassine is most commonly used as a base for further silicone coating for manufacture of release liner. 
Glassine is also employed as an interleaving paper in bookbinding, especially to protect fine illustrations from contact with facing pages; the paper can be manufactured with a neutral pH, and can prevent damage from spilling, exposure, or rubbing. Glassine adhesive tape has been used in book repair. In chemistry, glassine is used as an inexpensive weighing paper. It is used in foodservice as a barrier between strips of products (for example: meat, baked goods). Glassine is resistant to grease and facilitates separation of individual foodstuffs.

Glassine has been recommended for protecting the surface of stored acrylic paintings.  However, glassine will adhere to soft (not completely cured) and medium-rich paint, especially when stored for an extended period of time, and it may cause permanent damage to the painted surface.  Therefore, art conservators do not recommend that it be used to wrap paintings. Philatelists use glassine envelopes to store stamps, and stamp hinges are made of glassine. Amateur insect collectors use glassine envelopes to store specimens temporarily in the field before they are mounted in a collection. Entomologists collecting for research may likewise use such envelopes to store whole specimens in the field. Glassine envelopes are used to carry pharmacy reformulated drugs and illicit drugs such as cocaine and heroin.
Photographers used glassine sleeves for many decades to safely store their processed films. Glassine is also used to pack firecrackers, as it is moisture resistant. It is used for its transparent qualities to fold origami tessellations. Glassine is an outer covering on paperboard tubes, particularly those used in model rocketry, for water protection.

In the mid-20th century, potato chips were packaged in glassine bags. Herman Lay was a pioneer of using glassine in the chips industry.

References

Paper
Transparent materials